A Slovenian writer is a writer who has lived a significant period of time in Slovenia and has written about Slovenia-related themes in any language. The term includes Slovene writers who write in Slovene.

Writers who write about Slovenia-related themes in the languages other than Slovene
 Erica Johnson Debeljak
 Stanislava Chrobáková Repar
 Lidija Dimkovska

See also
 Slovene literature
 Culture of Slovenia

References